FC Lada Chernivtsi was a Ukrainian football club from Chernivtsi, Chernivtsi Oblast.

League and cup history

{|class="wikitable"
|-bgcolor="#efefef"
! Season
! Div.
! Pos.
! Pl.
! W
! D
! L
! GS
! GA
! P
!Domestic Cup
!colspan=2|Europe
!Notes
|-
|align=center|1992–93
|align=center|4th
|align=center bgcolor=tan|3
|align=center|24
|align=center|15
|align=center|2
|align=center|7
|align=center|43
|align=center|24
|align=center|32
|align=center|
|align=center|
|align=center|
|align=center|Zone 1
|-
|align=center|1993–94
|align=center|4th
|align=center bgcolor=silver|2
|align=center|26
|align=center|17
|align=center|5
|align=center|4
|align=center|47
|align=center|17
|align=center|39
|align=center|
|align=center|
|align=center|
|align=center|Zone 1, Promoted
|-
|align=center|1994–95
|align=center|3rd (lower)
|align=center|20
|align=center|42
|align=center|7
|align=center|5
|align=center|30
|align=center|21
|align=center|32
|align=center|26
|align=center|
|align=center|
|align=center|
|align=center|withdrew
|}

References

Lada Chernivtsi, FC
Football clubs in Chernivtsi Oblast
Association football clubs established in 1990
Association football clubs disestablished in 1995
1990 establishments in Ukraine
1995 disestablishments in Ukraine